Mount Wilhelm Christophersen is a mound-shaped, ice-covered landform which rises from the edge of the polar plateau  south of Antarctica's Mount Engelstad. The mound also overlooks the south side of the head of Axel Heiberg Glacier. It was discovered in 1911 by the Norwegian explorer Roald Amundsen and named by him for Wilhelm Christopher Christophersen, the Norwegian diplomat and Minister in Buenos Aires at that time.

Mountains of the Ross Dependency
Amundsen Coast